Jarrod Evans (born 25 July 1996) is a Welsh rugby union player who plays as a fly-half for Cardiff Rugby. He has also represented Wales and Wales U20s.

Club career
Evans played youth rugby for Pontyclun RFC, and made his debut for Pontypridd RFC at age 17.

Evans made his debut for Cardiff in 2015, having previously played for their academy.

In 2018, Evans won the 2017–18 European Rugby Challenge Cup with Cardiff, scoring 13 points in the final against Gloucester. 

On 29 January 2022, Evans kicked a last minute long range penalty against Leinster, propelling Cardiff to their first win over the Irish team since 2011.

International career
In October 2018, Evans was called up to the senior Wales squad for the Autumn internationals.

Evans made his debut for Wales coming off the bench for the final few minutes against Scotland in 2018 for the opening game of their November series.

References

External links 
Cardiff Rugby Player Profile
Wales Player Profile

Rugby union players from Pontypridd
Welsh rugby union players
Wales international rugby union players
Cardiff Rugby players
Living people
1996 births
Rugby union fly-halves